Alexander Georg Wurz (born 15 February 1974) is an Austrian former professional racing driver, driver training expert and businessman. He competed in Formula One from  until , and is also a two-time winner of the Le Mans 24 Hours.

He is currently under contract to race for the Toyota factory racing team in the WEC (World Endurance Championship).
In Formula 1, he is a commentator for TV and media, as well as being Williams F1 Team's driver coach, chairman of the Grand Prix Drivers' Association, and occasionally a driver steward.

Career

Cycling
Born in Waidhofen an der Thaya, Wurz competed in cycling events in his youth, and won the BMX World Championship in 1986 at the age of 12. In 2000, Wurz started a mountain bike team with his countryman Markus Rainer. The team, Rainer-Wurz.com, is sponsored by sponsors McLaren, Siemens, and Cannondale, and has won the World Cup several times. In the early 2000s, niche bicycle brand Katarga presented a limited edition high-end mountain bike called the Alexander Wurz EVO SL, whose frame prominently featured Wurz's autograph.

Auto racing

Early career
Like most Formula One drivers, Wurz's motorsport career began with karting. In 1991, Wurz drove in Formula Ford. In 1993, he switched to the German Formula Three Championship. During his time in Formula 3, Wurz crashed out of the lead at a race at AVUS in 1995 after a collision with the safety car. From 1996, Wurz drove an Opel Calibra for the Joest Racing touring car team in the DTM. Also in 1996, Wurz, together with Davy Jones and Manuel Reuter, won the Le Mans 24 Hours and in so doing became the youngest ever winner of the 24-hour race, a record he still holds.

Formula One

Benetton (1997–2000)

Wurz's Formula One debut was on 15 June 1997 at Montreal for Benetton filling in for fellow Austrian Gerhard Berger, who could not race due to illness. Wurz achieved a podium position in his third race (1997 British Grand Prix) before returning to being a test driver upon Berger's return to the cockpit at the German Grand Prix, which Berger won.

Wurz was given a full-time race seat for the 1998 season with Benetton and spent three more seasons at the team, partnered each year by Giancarlo Fisichella. In 1998, he outscored Fisichella by one point to finish joint 7th in the driver's championship together with Heinz-Harald Frentzen. At the 1998 Monaco Grand Prix, he was running second ahead of Michael Schumacher for a brief period, but his hopes of a podium finish were ruined when Schumacher collided with him when tried to pass at Loews hairpin. The collision broke his suspension, causing him to spin off and crash at the Nouvelle Chicane exiting the tunnel.

The 1999 season was a disappointment for both drivers with the uncompetitive B199 (although Fisichella scored a podium in Canada). In the 2000 season, Wurz scored points only at the Italian Grand Prix, while Fisichella scored podium finishes three times. For 2001, Benetton's last season before its transformation into Renault, he was replaced with Jenson Button.

Testing (2001–2006)

In , Wurz was a test driver for McLaren. In  he was almost promoted as race driver for McLaren to replace Mika Häkkinen but he remained as test driver after Kimi Räikkönen took over.

In April 2005, with Juan Pablo Montoya injured, Wurz drove for McLaren in the 2005 San Marino Grand Prix, finishing fourth in the race, but taking third place after both BAR-Honda drivers were disqualified. This gave him the record for the longest interval between podium finishes at eight years.

Since signing to McLaren as test driver, Wurz had been eager to return to racing. At various times, rumours linked him to a return to a full race seat. In  he was strongly linked to a race seat at Jaguar, where the under-fire Antônio Pizzonia was struggling. However, McLaren were struggling with their abortive new car and blocked the move to retain Wurz as a development driver. Jaguar then decided to give Pizzonia more time to prove himself, before drafting in Justin Wilson.

Williams (2007)

Wurz signed a deal with WilliamsF1 to become the team's official test and reserve driver at the beginning of 2006. It was announced on 3 August 2006 that Wurz would replace Mark Webber as a race driver at Williams for the  season. This was Wurz's first full-time race drive since 2000, and his teammate was Nico Rosberg. At the Monaco GP on 27 May 2007, Wurz scored his first points for Williams, finishing in 7th place after qualifying 11th. He came third for the third time in his F1 career at the Canadian Grand Prix on 10 June 2007, having started 19th on the grid in an action packed race. He nearly repeated this at the European Grand Prix, but was unable to overtake Mark Webber at the final chicane. That race turned out to be Wurz's last points finish. On 8 October 2007 he announced his immediate retirement from Formula One, meaning that the 2007 Chinese Grand Prix was his final race. He cited doubts over his own commitment as the main reason for his departure. He was replaced by Williams test driver Kazuki Nakajima for the final race of the 2007 season in Brazil.

Honda and Brawn GP (2008–2009)

Williams (2012)
For the 2012 Formula One season, Wurz rejoined the Williams F1 Team, this time to guide the team's inexperienced drivers Bruno Senna and Pastor Maldonado.

Sportscars
Wurz signed with Peugeot to be part of their driving squad for the 2008 24 Hours of Le Mans and he also participated 1000km of Spa in the Le Mans Series.

In 2009, together with Marc Gené and David Brabham, he took outright victory in the Le Mans 24 Hours, driving a works Peugeot. The 13-year gap between Wurz's victories is the largest in the event's history. Together with his victory in 2010 of the 12hrs race of Sebring with Marc Gené and Anthony Davidson and his victory of the 1000 miles race of Road Atlanta with Stéphane Sarrazin and Franck Montagny in 2011 it made him win the 3 big Sportscar Classic Races in a Peugeot 908.
Wurz continued to race for Peugeot Sport Total through 2010 and 2011, though no further Le Mans wins were forthcoming. In November 2011, Toyota Motorsports confirmed Wurz as one of their factory drivers for the companies planned return to the 24 Heures du Mans in 2012. Wurz will drive their new LMP1 Hybrid Prototype alongside Nicolas Lapierre and Kazuki Nakajima.

Rallycross
In May 2018 Wurz announced that he would follow in the footsteps of his father by making his competitive rallycross debut at the FIA World Rallycross Championship's World RX of Norway at Lånkebanen the following month, driving a Ford Fiesta Supercar for MJP Racing Team Austria.

Road safety
Wurz is involved in many projects regarding road safety and driver education and training. In 2006, he and his father founded the company Test and Training International, a leader in the field of road safety and driver training. He also works closely with the FIA (Fédération Internationale de l'Automobile), since 2011 as an operating partner of the FIA Institute Young Driver Excellence Academy.

Medical car driver
In the 2008 Singapore Grand Prix, Wurz drove the medical car after regular driver Jacques Tropenat fell ill.

Team management

Team Superfund
Wurz lodged an entry for his own team into Formula One (announced on 31 May 2009) but the application was unsuccessful. Team Superfund was one of several new applicants hoping to compete in the sport from the 2010 season onwards. It was believed that Wurz would prefer to align the team with an existing constructor based in the UK, perhaps renting space, facilities and staff from its factory, while Superfund takes time to build up its own headquarters, possibly based on existing resources in Austria. The team would have been funded by Christian Baha, the owner of the Superfund Group, and the cars would be powered by Cosworth engines.

Personal life
Wurz is the second son of former rallycross driver Franz Wurz, who won the European Rallycross Championship in 1974, 1976 and 1982.

Wurz is married to Julia Horden and has three sons: Charlie (also a racing driver), Felix and Oscar. He used to race with different coloured boots on each foot, but since his return to racing in 2007, he wears matching pairs. On 10 November 2015 Wurz announced via his Twitter that after 20 years he would retire from racing.

Racing record

Career summary

Complete International Touring Car Championship results
(key) (Races in bold indicate pole position) (Races in italics indicate fastest lap)

Complete Formula One results
(key) (Races in italics indicate fastest lap)

 Driver did not finish the Grand Prix, but was classified as he completed over 90% of the race distance.

Sports car racing

Le Mans 24 Hours results

Le Mans Series results

 1 Driver run for the Intercontinental Le Mans Cup, no points awarded for the Le Mans Series.

American Le Mans Series results

 1 Driver run for the Intercontinental Le Mans Cup, no points awarded for the American Le Mans Series.

Intercontinental Le Mans Cup results

Complete FIA World Endurance Championship results

Complete IMSA SportsCar Championship results
(key) (Races in bold indicate pole position) (Races in italics indicate fastest lap)

Complete FIA World Rallycross Championship results
(key)

Supercar

References

External links 

 
 
 interview: Tyler's Long One: Alex Wurz, interviewer: Graham Tyler,

1974 births
Living people
People from Waidhofen an der Thaya District
24 Hours of Le Mans drivers
24 Hours of Le Mans winning drivers
Austrian Formula One drivers
Benetton Formula One drivers
McLaren Formula One drivers
Williams Formula One drivers
Austrian racing drivers
British Formula Three Championship drivers
BMX riders
FIA GT Championship drivers
German Formula Three Championship drivers
EFDA Nations Cup drivers
American Le Mans Series drivers
European Le Mans Series drivers
Austrian Formula Three Championship drivers
Austrian expatriate sportspeople in Germany
Austrian expatriate sportspeople in Monaco
Austrian expatriate sportspeople in England
FIA World Endurance Championship drivers
24 Hours of Daytona drivers
WeatherTech SportsCar Championship drivers
12 Hours of Sebring drivers
Sportspeople from Lower Austria
Walter Lechner Racing drivers
RSM Marko drivers
G+M Escom Motorsport drivers
Team Joest drivers
Mercedes-AMG Motorsport drivers
Peugeot Sport drivers
Toyota Gazoo Racing drivers
Porsche Motorsports drivers
Chip Ganassi Racing drivers